SDYuShOR Sokil-90 Kyiv was an ice hockey team in Kyiv, Ukraine. They participated in the Ukrainian Hockey Championship during the 2005-06 season. The team was made up solely of players born in 1990 or later.

They finished with a record of 1 win and 19 losses, with 12 goals for and 271 goals against during the 2005-06 season.

References

Ice hockey teams in Ukraine
Sokil Kyiv
Sport in Kyiv